Igor Araújo (born 6 December 1980) is a Brazilian professional mixed martial artist currently competing in the Welterweight division. A professional competitor since 2004, Araújo has formerly competed for the UFC, M-1 Global, Shooto, KSW, and was a contestant on The Ultimate Fighter: Team Carwin vs. Team Nelson.

Background
Originally from Brasilia, Brazil, Araújo competed in football until the age of 19 when he began turning his focus to mixed martial arts. Araújo also holds an accomplished background in Brazilian jiu-jitsu; Araújo is a black belt and has won numerous titles in the sport including the European and Brazilian championships.

Mixed martial arts career

Early career
Araújo made his professional MMA debut in 2004 and compiled a record of 23-6 before invited to compete on The Ultimate Fighter: Team Carwin vs. Team Nelson.

The Ultimate Fighter
Araújo defeated Cortez Coleman in the entry round via triangle choke submission in a "sudden death" overtime and was picked 13th overall by Team Carwin.

Araújo defeated Nic Herron-Webb in the quarterfinals via majority decision. Araújo then faced eventual season winner Colton Smith in the semifinals, and was defeated via unanimous decision.

Ultimate Fighting Championship
Araújo made his official debut at UFC Fight Night 29 on 9 October 2013 against Ildemar Alcântara. Araújo won via unanimous decision.

Araújo made his next appearance on 8 March 2014 at UFC Fight Night 37 against Danny Mitchell. Araújo won via unanimous decision.

Araújo faced George Sullivan on 13 September 2014 at UFC Fight Night 51 on 13 September 2014. Araújo lost via knockout in the second round.

Araújo faced Sean Strickland on 15 July 2015 at UFC Fight Night 71. He lost the fight by unanimous decision. He lost the fight by unanimous decision. Some months after this loss, he was cut from the UFC.

Mixed martial arts record

|-
| Loss
| align=center| 25–10 (1) 
| Gerardo Nunez
| KO (punches)
| AFL 14: Outbreak
| 
| align=center| 1
| align=center| 2:43
| Canary Islands, Spain
|
|-
| Loss
| align=center| 25–9 (1) 
| Marvin Vettori
| Submission (guillotine choke)
| Venator FC 3
| 
| align=center| 1
| align=center| 1:13
| Milan, Italy
|Middleweight bout.
|-
| Loss
| align=center| 25–8 (1) 
| Sean Strickland
| Decision (unanimous)
| UFC Fight Night: Mir vs. Duffee
| 
| align=center| 3
| align=center| 5:00
| San Diego, California, United States
|
|-
| Loss
| align=center| 25–7 (1)
| George Sullivan
| KO (punches)
| UFC Fight Night: Bigfoot vs. Arlovski
| 
| align=center| 2
| align=center| 2:31
| Brasília, Brazil
| 
|-
| Win
| align=center| 25–6 (1)
| Danny Mitchell
| Decision (unanimous)
| UFC Fight Night: Gustafsson vs. Manuwa
| 
| align=center| 3
| align=center| 5:00
| London, England
| 
|-
| Win
| align=center| 24–6 (1)
| Ildemar Alcântara
| Decision (unanimous)
| UFC Fight Night: Maia vs. Shields
| 
| align=center| 3
| align=center| 5:00
| São Paulo, Brazil
| 
|-
| Win
| align=center| 23–6 (1)
| Nic Herron-Webb
| Decision (unanimous)
| Flawless FC 3: California Love
| 
| align=center| 5
| align=center| 5:00
| Inglewood, California, United States
| 
|-
| Win
| align=center| 22–6 (1)
| Uriel Loutina
| Submission (arm-triangle choke)
| WUFC: Memorial 7
| 
| align=center| 2
| align=center| 4:10
| Martigny, Switzerland
| 
|-
| Win
| align=center| 21–6 (1)
| Ivica Truscek
| Submission (rear-naked choke)
| Lions FC: Lions Fighting Championship
| 
| align=center| 2
| align=center| 4:44
| Neuchatel, Switzerland
| 
|-
| Win
| align=center| 20–6 (1)
| Vitaliy Ostrovskiy
| Submission (rear-naked choke)
| RF: Real Fight-FC
| 
| align=center| 3
| align=center| 4:12
| Minsk, Belarus
| 
|-
| Loss
| align=center| 19–6 (1)
| Rashid Magomedov
| Decision (unanimous)
| M-1 Challenge 21: Guram vs. Garner
| 
| align=center| 3
| align=center| 5:00
| St. Petersburg, Russia
| 
|-
| Win
| align=center| 19–5 (1)
| Dejan Milosevic
| Submission (armbar)
| SHC 3: Carmont vs. Zahariev
| 
| align=center| 1
| align=center| 2:50
| Geneva, Switzerland
| 
|-
| Win
| align=center| 18–5 (1)
| Raymond Jarman
| Decision (unanimous)
| Yamabushi: Combat Sport Night 6
| 
| align=center| 2
| align=center| 5:00
| Geneva, Switzerland
| 
|-
| Win
| align=center| 17–5 (1)
| Vaidas Valancius
| Submission (arm-triangle choke)
| SHC 2: Battle for the Belt
| 
| align=center| 1
| align=center| 0:47
| Geneva, Switzerland
| 
|-
| Win
| align=center| 16–5 (1)
| Wilhelm Ott
| Submission (arm-triangle choke)
| VFN: Fabulous Las Vegas
| 
| align=center| 1
| align=center| 1:42
| Vienna, Austria
| 
|-
| Win
| align=center| 15–5 (1)
| Karim Mammar
| Submission (armbar)
| SHC 1: Angels or Demons
| 
| align=center| 1
| align=center| 4:50
| Geneva, Switzerland
| 
|-
| Win
| align=center| 14–5 (1)
| Michele Verginelli
| Decision (majority)
| XC 1: Xtreme MMA Championship
| 
| align=center| 3
| align=center| 5:00
| Rome, Italy
| 
|-
| Win
| align=center| 13–5 (1)
| Lopez Owonyebe
| KO (knee)
| Yamabushi: Combat Sport Night 5
| 
| align=center| 1
| align=center| 1:29
| Geneva, Switzerland
| 
|-
| Win
| align=center| 12–5 (1)
| Vener Galiev
| Submission (armbar)
| UF: Universal Fighter
| 
| align=center| 1
| align=center| 0:57
| Ufa, Russia
| 
|-
| Loss
| align=center| 11–5 (1)
| Jim Wallhead
| TKO (punches)
| M-1 Challenge 7: UK
| 
| align=center| 1
| align=center| 1:19
| Nottingham, England
| 
|-
| Loss
| align=center| 11–4 (1)
| Vladimir Yushko
| Decision (unanimous)
| FEFoMP: World Pankration Championship 2008
| 
| align=center| 2
| align=center| 5:00
| Khabarovsk, Russia
| 
|-
| Win
| align=center| 11–3 (1)
| Islam Merzhaev
| Submission (armbar)
| FEFoMP: World Pankration Championship 2008
| 
| align=center| 2
| align=center| 1:26
| Khabarovsk, Russia
|
|-
| Win
| align=center| 10–3 (1)
| Sascha Kress
| Submission (armbar)
| FFC: All or Nothing
| 
| align=center| 1
| align=center| 0:42 
| Leipzig, Germany
| 
|-
| Win
| align=center| 9–3 (1)
| Apo Gatta Gome
| Submission (armbar)
| Fight Fiesta: Deluxe 2
| 
| align=center| 1
| align=center| N/A
| Luxemburg
| 
|-
| Win
| align=center| 8–3 (1)
| Bastiaan Rejen
| Decision (unanimous)
| UG 4: 20 Years Anniversary
| 
| align=center| 2
| align=center| 5:00
| Deventer, Netherlands
| 
|-
| Win
| align=center| 7–3 (1)
| Marcin Krysztofiak
| Submission (triangle choke)
| FFL: Fight Fiesta de Luxe
| 
| align=center| 2
| align=center| 0:50
| Luxemburg
| 
|-
| Win
| align=center| 6–3 (1)
| Sascha Kress
| Submission (armbar)
| FFC: Big Bad Boyz
| 
| align=center| 1
| align=center| 3:30
| Leipzig, Germany
| 
|-
| Win
| align=center| 5–3 (1)
| Tomas Stone
| Submission (choke)
| Shooto: Switzerland 5
| 
| align=center| 1
| align=center| N/A
| Zurich, Switzerland
| 
|-
| Loss
| align=center| 4–3 (1)
| Krzysztof Kulak
| Submission (rear-naked choke)
| KSW 6: Konfrontacja
| 
| align=center| 2
| align=center| 3:25
| Warsaw, Poland
| 
|-
| Loss
| align=center| 4–2 (1)
| Jean-Francois Lenogue
| TKO (punches)
| WFC: Europe vs. Brazil
| 
| align=center| 3
| align=center| 2:19
| Koper, Slovenia
| 
|-
| NC
| align=center| 4–1 (1)
| Boris Jonstomp
| No Contest
| CE: Championnat D'Europe
| 
| align=center| 2
| align=center| 5:00
| Geneva, Switzerland
| 
|-
| Win
| align=center| 4–1
| Hans Stringer
| Submission (triangle choke)
| Shooto Holland: Playing With Fire
| 
| align=center| 1
| align=center| 1:27
| Ede, Netherlands
| 
|-
| Win
| align=center| 3–1
| Santa Rita
| Submission (kneebar)
| Juiz de Fora: Fight 2
| 
| align=center| 1
| align=center| 0:32
| Juiz de Fora, Brazil
| 
|-
| Loss
| align=center| 2–1
| Edgard Castaldelli Filho
| Decision (unanimous)
| GOF: Goiania Open Fight 1
| 
| align=center| 3
| align=center| 5:00
| Goiânia, Brazil
| 
|-
| Win
| align=center| 2–0
| João Takeshita
| Submission (kneebar)
| GOF: Goiania Open Fight 1
| 
| align=center| 1
| align=center| 0:49
| Goiânia, Brazil
| 
|-
| Win
| align=center| 1–0
| Murilo Rosa Filho
| Decision (unanimous)
| CTR: Coliseu Tres Rios
| 
| align=center| 3
| align=center| 5:00
| Belo Horizonte, Brazil
|

References

External links 
 
 

1980 births
Living people
Brazilian practitioners of Brazilian jiu-jitsu
People awarded a black belt in Brazilian jiu-jitsu
Brazilian male mixed martial artists
Light heavyweight mixed martial artists
Middleweight mixed martial artists
Welterweight mixed martial artists
Mixed martial artists utilizing Brazilian jiu-jitsu
Ultimate Fighting Championship male fighters
Sportspeople from Brasília